"My Lucille" is a 1985 song written for the 1985 John Landis film called Into the Night, starring Jeff Goldblum and Michelle Pfeiffer. It was written by Ira Newborn and recorded by B.B. King. The title of the song is reference to  B.B. King's guitar. The song was used in movie while Ed Okin (Jeff Goldblum) is walking through the night club.

Music video
The music video for the song was directed by John Landis, and was broadcast as part of the television documentary film B.B. King "Into the Night". The video features Goldblum, Pfeiffer, and Dan Aykroyd from Into the Night, as well as Steve Martin and Eddie Murphy.

1985 songs
Songs written for films
B.B. King songs
Music videos directed by John Landis